Marlene Dietrich Overseas is the first Marlene Dietrich album. Orchestra conducted by Jimmy Carroll. Issued on 10" LP by Columbia Records under the catalogue number LP GL105. All the vocals are in German translated by Lothar Metzl (except Lili Marlene). Reissued on 12" LP by Columbia as Lili Marlene (Columbia GL 4-17) with the addition of the following tracks: "Das Hobellied", "Du Liegst Mir im Herzen", "Muss i denn" and "Du Hast die Seele Mein". The eight songs were re-released in CD in a compilation album called "Art Deco - The Cosmopolitan Marlene Dietrich".

Track listing

See also
 Marlene Dietrich discography

References

1951 albums
Decca Records albums
Marlene Dietrich albums
German-language albums